Pauline Jantina te Beest (born 13 February 1970 in Haarlem) is a Netherlands cricketer who played in three Women's Cricket World Cups in England (1993), in India (1997) and in New Zealand (2000). She had one season for the Otago Sparks in the State League. She was also the first woman to score 1,000 runs in ODIs for the Netherlands.

See also 
 List of centuries in women's One Day International cricket

References

Dutch women cricketers
Otago Sparks cricketers
Sportspeople from Haarlem
1970 births
Living people
Netherlands women One Day International cricketers
Dutch women cricket captains